Following is the complete list of 124 novels written by the original author Ibn-e-Safi in Jasoosi Dunya (جاسوسی دنیا) series. (Original number, original title (Roman), original title (Urdu), translated tile in parentheses, year first published.)

 Dilaer Mujrim  (دلير مجرم)  (The Courageous Criminal) Bilal Naseem -  1952
  KHaufnaak Jungle  (خوناک جنگل)  (The Terrifying Jungle)  -  1952
  Aurat Farosh ka Qatil (عورت فروش کا قاتل) (The Killer of Women-Merchant)  -  1952
  Tijoari ka Raaz (تجوری کا راز) (The Secret of the Safe)  -  1952
  Fareedi aur Leonard (فریدی اور لیونارڈ) (Fareedi and Leonard)  -  1952
  Pur-asraar kuNwaaN (پُراسرار کنواں) (The Mysterious Well)  -  1952
  KHatarnaak BooRha (خطرناک بوڑھا) (The Dangerous Old Man)  -  1952
  Masnooyi Naak (مصنوعی ناک) (The Artificial Nose)  -  1952
  Pur-asrar Aajnabee (پُراسرار انجبی) (The Mysterious Stranger)  -  1952
  AHmaQoaN ka Chakkar (احمقوں کا چکر) (The Case of the Fools)  -  1952
  PaHaaRoaN ki Malika (پہاڑوں کی ملکہ) (The Queen of the Mountains)  -  1952
  Maut ki Aandhi (موت کی آندھی) (The Death Storm)  -  1953
  Heeray ki Kaan (ہیرے کی کان) (The Diamond Mine)  -  1953
  Tijoari ka Geet (تجوری کا گیت) (The Song of the Safe)  -  1953
  AatiSHi Paranda (آتشی پرندہ) (The Fiery Bird)  -  1953
  KHooni PatTHar (خونی پتھر) (The Bloody Stone)  -  1953
  BHayanak Jazeera (بھیانک جزیرہ) (The Terrifying Island)  -  1953
  Ajeeb AawaazaiN (عجیب آوازیں) (The Strange Sounds)  -  1953
  RaQQasa ka Qat'l (رقاصہ کا قتل) (The Murder of a Dancer)  -  1953
  Neeli Raushni (نیلی روشنی) (The Blue Light)  -  1953
  SHahi NaQQarah (شاہی نقارہ) (The Royal Drum)  -  1953
  KHoon ka Dirya (خون کا دریا) (The River of Blood)  -  1953
  Qatil SaNgraezay (قاتل سنگرزے) (The Killer Pebbles)  -  1953
  PatTHar ki CheeKH (پتھر کی چیخ) (The Cry of the Stone)  -  1954
  KHaufnaak HaNgaama (خافناک ہنگامہ) (The Terrifying Racket)  -  1954
  DuHra Qat'l (دوہرا قتل) (The Double Murder)  -  1954
  CHaar Shikari (چار شکاری) (The Four Hunters)  -  1954
  Be-guna Mujrim (بے گناہ مجرم) (The Innocent Criminal)  -  1954
  LaSHooN ka AabShaar (لاشوں کا آبشار) (The Waterfall of Corpses)  -  1954
  MooNCHh MoonDnay Wali (مونچھ مونڈنے والی) (The Moustache Shaver Lady)  -  1954
  GeetoaN key DHamaakey (گیتوں کے دھماکے) (The Explosions of Songs)  -  1954
  SiyaaH PoasH LuTaerA (سیاہ پوش لٹیرا) (The Black Clad Robber)  -  1954
  Bur'f key BHoot (برف کے بھوت) (The Snow Ghosts)  -  1954
  Pur-haul SannAaTa (پُرہول سناٹا) (The Fearful Silence)  -  1954
  CHeeKHtay DareeCHay (چیختے دریچے) (The Crying Doors)  -  1954
  KHatarnaak DuSHman (خطرناک دشمن) (The Dangerous Enemy)  -  1955
  Jungle ki Aag (جنگل کی آگ) (The Fire of Forest)  -  1955
  KuChlee Hui LaaSH (کچلی ہوئی لاش) (The Crushed Corpse)  -  1955
  AndHaeray ka ShahiSHah (اندھیرے کا شہنشاہ) (The Emperor of the Darkness)  -  1955
  Pur-asrar Wasi'yat (پُراسرار وصیت) (The Mysterious Will)  -  1955
  Maut ki ChaTaan (موت کی چٹان) (The Rock of Death)  -  1955
  Neeli Lakeer (نیلی لکیر) (The Blue Line)  -  1955
  Tareek SA'aye (تاریک سائے) (The Dark Shadows)  -  1955
  Saazish ka Jaal (سازش کا جال) (The Conspiracy Trap)  -  1955
  KHooni Bagoolay (خونی بگولے) (The Bloody Whirlwinds)  -  1955
  LaSHoaN ka Saudagar (لاشوں کا سوداگر) (The Merchant of Corpses)  -  1955
  Haulnaak Veeranay (ہولناک ویرانے) (The Frightening Wilderness)  -  1955
  Leonard ki Waapsi (لیونارڈ کی واپسی) (The Return of Leonard)  -  1956
  No Jasoosi Dunya book published on this number. (It was mistakenly allotted to Imran series book, BHayanak Aadmi)
  Pagal KHanay ka Qaidee (پاگل خانے کا قیدی) (The Prisoner of the Asylum)  -  1956
  SHoaloaN ka NaaCH (شعلوں کا ناچ) (The Dance of the Flames)  -  1956
  GiyaarHwaaN Zeenaa (گیارہواں زینہ) (The Eleventh Step)  -  1956
  SurKH DA'irah (سرخ دائرہ) (The Red Circle)  -  1956
  KHooNKHwaar LaRkiyaaN (خونخوار لڑکیاں) (The Infuriated Girls)  -  1956
  SsA'ay ki LaaSH (سائے کی لاش) (The Corpse of Silhouette)  -  1956
  Pehla Shoala (پہلا شعلہ) (The First Flame)  -  1956
  Doosra Shoala (دوسرا شعلہ) (The Second Flame)  -  1956
  Teesra Shoala (تیسرا شعلہ) (The Third Flame)  -  1956
  JaHannam ka Shoala (جہنم کا شعلہ) (The Hellfire)  -  1956
  ZeHreelay Teer (زہریلے تیر) (The Poisonous Arrows)  -  1957
  Paani ka DHuwAaN (پانی کا دھواں) (The Water Smoke)  -  1957
  LaaSH ka QeHqaHaa (لاش کا قہقہ) (The Laughter of the Corpse)  -  1957
  Daaktar Dread (ڈاکٹر ڈریڈ) (Dr. Dread)  -  1957
  Shaitaan ki MeHbooba (شیطان کی محبوبہ) (The Devil’s Lover)  -  1957
  AnoakHay RaQQas (انوکھے رقاص) (The Novel Dancers)  -  1957
  Pur-asrar Moojid (پُراسرار موجد) (The Mysterious Inventor)  -  1957
  Toofaan ka AGHwaa (طوفان کا اغوا) (The Abduction of Storm)  -  1957
  RA'ifal ka NaGHmaa (رائفل کا نغمہ) (The Song of the Rifle)  -  1957
  THanDi Aag (ٹھنڈی آگ) (The cold Fire)  -  1957
  Japaan ka Fitnaa (جاپان کا فتنہ) (The Hellion from Japan)  -  1957
  DuSHmanoaN ka SHeh'r (دشمنوں کا شہر) (The City of Enemies)  -  1957
  LaaSh ka Bulaawa (لاش کا بلاوا) (The Invitation of a Corpse)  -  1958
  Guard ka AGHwa (گارڈ کا اغوا) (The Abduction of Guard)  -  1958
  Shadi ka HaNgaama (شادی کا ہنگامہ) (The Racket of the Wedding)  -  1958
  Zameen key Badal (زمین کے بادل) (The Clouds of Earth)  -  1958 [Also featuring Ali Imran]
  WabA'ie Haijaan (وبائی ہیجان) (The Epidemic Agitation)  -  1958
  OoNCHaa Shikaar (اونچا شکار) (The Prized Victim)  -  1958
  Aawaarah SheHzaada (آوارہ شہزادہ) (Prince Loafer)  -  1958
  Chandni ka DHuA'N (چاندنی کا دھواں) (The Moonlight Smoke)  -  1958
  SaeNkRoaN HamSHak'l (سینکڑوں ہمشکل) (The Copious Twins)  -  1958
  LaRaakoaN ki Basti (لڑاکوں کی بستی) (The Town of the Fighters)  -  1959
  UlTee Tasweer (الٹی تصویر) (The Upturned Painting)  -  1959
  Chamkeela Ghubaar (چمکیلا غبار) (The Glittering Dust)  -  1959
  AnoakHee RaHzani (انوکھی رہزنی) (The Novel Robbery)  -  1959
  DHu'AaN UTH Raha Tha (دھواں اُٹھ رہا تھا) (The Rising Smoke)  -  1959
  Farhaad 59 (فرہاد 59) (Farhaad 59)  -  1959
  ZeHreela Aadmi (زہریلا آدمی) (The Poisonous Man)  -  1963
  Prince VehSHee (پرنس وحشی) (The Untamed Prince)  -  1960
  BayChara/BayChari (بیچارہ/بیچاری) (The Effeminate Man)  -  1963
  ISHaaroaN key Shikaar (اشاروں کے شکار) (The Victims of Signs)  -  1964
  SitAaroaN ki Maut (ستاروں کی موت) (The Death of Stars)  -  1964
  SitaroaN ki CheeKHaeN (ستاروں کے چیخیں) (The Screams of Stars)  -  1964
  SaatwaaN jazeerah (ساتواں جزیرہ) (The Seventh Island)  -  1965
  SHaitaani Jheel (شیطانی جھیل) (The Satanic Lake)  -  1965
  SuneHree ChingaariyaaN (سنہری چنگاریاں) (The Golden Sparks)  -  1965
  SeHmee hu'i LaRki (سہمی ہوئی لڑکی) (The Frightened Girl)  -  1966
  Qatil ka Haath (قاتل کا ہاتھ) (The Hand of the Killer)  -  1966
  Rulaaney Wali (رُلانے والی) (The Lady who made them Weep)  -  1966
  Tasweer ka DuSHman (تصویر کا دشمن) (The Enemy of the Picture)  -  1967
  Devpaekar Darandaa (دیو پیکر درندہ) (The Humongous Beast) -  1967
  Tisdal ki Baedari (ٹسڈل کی بیداری) (The Awakening of Tisdle)  -  1967
  KHaufnaak Mansooba (خوفناک منصوبہ) (The Terrifying Plot)  -  1968
  TabaaHi ka KHwaab (تباہی کا خواب) (The Nightmare of Destruction)  -  1968
  MuHlik ShanaasA'ee (مہلک شناسائی) (The Fatal Acquaintance)  -  1968
  DHu'AaN Hu'i deewar (دھواں ہوئی دیوار) (The Smoked Wall)  -  1969
  KHooni RaiSHay (خونی ریشے) (The Killing Fibre)  -  1969
  Teesri Naagan (تیسری ناگن) (The Third Spirent)  -  1969
  Raegambaala (ریگم بالا) (Raegambala)  -  1970
  BHaRiyay ki Aawaaz (بھیڑیے کی آواز) (The Howling of Wolf)  -  1970
  Ajnabi ka Faraar (اجنبی کا فرار) (The Escape of the Stranger)  -  1971
  RauSHan Hayoola (روشن ہیولٰی) (The Blazing Aura)  -  1971
  Zard Fitna (زرد فتنہ) (The Yellow Hellion)  -  1971
  Rait ka Devta (ریت کا دیوتا) (The Sand God)  -  1972
  SaaNpoan ka MaseeHa (سانپوں کا مسیحا) (The Heeler of Snakes)  -  1973
  THanDa JaHannam (ٹھنڈا جہنم) (The Cold Hell)  -  1973
  Azeem HamaaQat (عظیم حماقت) (The Great Folly)  -  1974
  ZeHreela Sayaarah (زہریلا سیارہ)  (The Deadly Planet)  -  1975
  Neelum ki Wapsi(نیلم کی واپسی) (The Return of Neelum)  -  1976
  Mauroosi Havas (مورثی ہوس) (The Inherited Lust)  -  1976
  DeHshat-gard (دہشت گر) (The Terrorist)  -  1977
  Shikaaree ParCHiyaaN (شکاری پرچھائیاں) (The Killer Shadows)  -  1978
  parCHiyoaN key Hamlay (پرچھائیوں کے حملے) (The Attack of Shadows)  -  1978
  SA'ayoaN ka TakrAa'O (سایوں کا ٹکراؤ) (The Showdown of Silhouettes)  -  1978
  Hamzaad ka Maskan (ہمزاد کا مسکن) (The Dwelling of the Other Self)  -  1978
  SehrA'ee Deewaanah-I (صحرائی دیوانہ) (The Desert Lunatic  Part-1)  -  1979
  SehrA'ee Deewaanah-II (صحرائی دیوانہ) (The Desert Lunatic Part-2)  -  1979

See also 
 Ibne Safi
 Jasoosi Dunya

Notes

Jasoosi Dunya
Jasoosi Dunya
Ibn-e-Safi